The 1993 Atlantic 10 Conference Baseball Championship was held at Bear Stadium in Boyertown, Pennsylvania from May 14 through 16. The double elimination tournament featured the league's top four regular-season finishers. Top-seeded Rutgers defeated West Virginia in the title game to win the tournament for the sixth time, earning the Atlantic 10's automatic bid to the 1993 NCAA Tournament.

Seeding and format 
The league's top four teams, based on winning percentage in the 21-game regular-season schedule, were seeded one through four.

A-10 tiebreaking procedures gave George Washington the fourth seed over Saint Joseph's.

Bracket

All-Tournament 
Rutgers's Doug Alongi was named Most Outstanding Player, while Temple's Steve Hoppel was named Most Outstanding Pitcher.

References 

Atlantic 10 Conference tournament
Atlantic 10 Conference Baseball Tournament
Atlantic 10 Conference baseball tournament
Atlantic 10 Conference baseball tournament
Baseball in Pennsylvania
College sports in Pennsylvania
History of Berks County, Pennsylvania
Sports competitions in Pennsylvania
Sports in the Delaware Valley
Tourist attractions in Berks County, Pennsylvania